SBIR may refer to

 Small Business Innovation Research
 Speaker Boundary Interference Response - Interaction of sound from loudspeakers with room boundaries, see  Speaker Placement